Radio Days is a 1987 American comedy-drama film written and directed by Woody Allen, who also narrates the story. The film looks back on an American family's life during the Golden Age of Radio using both music and memories to tell the story. It stars an ensemble cast.

Plot
Joe, the narrator, relates how two burglars got involved in a radio game after picking up the phone during a home burglary. He goes on to explain that he associates old radio songs with childhood memories.

During the late 1930s and early 1940s young Joe lived in a modest Jewish-American family in Rockaway Beach. His mother always listened to Breakfast with Irene and Roger. His father kept his occupation secret. Joe later found out that he was ashamed of being a taxi driver. Other family members were Uncle Abe and Aunt Ceil, grandpa and grandma, and Aunt Bea. The latter was a serial dater, always on the lookout for a potential husband.

Joe's own favourite radio show was The Masked Avenger. It made him dream of buying a secret decoder ring. In Joe's fantasy the Masked Avenger looked like a hero, but in reality the voice actor was short and bald. Other radio memories are stories about sporting heroes, news bulletins about World War II, a report of an Martian invasion, and a live report of the search for a little girl who fell into a well.

With his friends from school Joe was searching for German aircraft, but instead they saw a woman undressing in her bedroom. She later turned out to be their substitute teacher. Alone on the coast Joe saw a German U-boat, but he decided not to tell anyone because they wouldn't believe him.

Joe was fascinated by the glitz and glamour of Manhattan, where the radio broadcasts were made. He visited the Radio City Music Hall, and described it as the most beautiful thing he ever saw.

Joe collected stories of radio stars, including that of Sally White, whose dreams of becoming famous were hampered by her bad voice and accent. Starting as a cigar salesgirl she got stuck on the roof of the radio building with Roger, who was cheating on Irene. After she witnessed a crime the gangster Rocco wanted to kill her, but following his mother's advice he ended up using his connections to further her career. She finally became a reporter of celebrity gossip.

On New Year's Eve Joe was brought down from his room to celebrate the transition to 1944. Simultaneously the radio stars gathered on the roof of their building. The narrator concludes that he will never forget those radio voices, although with each passing of a New Year's Eve they seem to glow dimmer and dimmer.

Cast

 Woody Allen as Joe, the Narrator
 Hy Anzell as Mr. Waldbaum
 Seth Green as Young Joe
 Danny Aiello as Rocco
 Sydney Blake as Miss Gordon
 Leah Carrey as Grandma
 Jeff Daniels as Biff Baxter
 Larry David as Communist Neighbor
 Gina DeAngelis as Rocco's mother
 Denise Dumont as Latin singer
 Mia Farrow as Sally White
 Todd Field as Crooner
 Kitty Carlisle Hart as Maxwell House (Coffee) Radio Jingle Singer
 Paul Herman as Burglar
 Julie Kavner as Mother
 Diane Keaton as New Year's Singer
 Julie Kurnitz as Irene Draper
 Renée Lippin as Aunt Ceil
 William Magerman as Grandpa
 Joy Newman as Ruthie
 Judith Malina as Mrs. Waldbaum
 Brian Mannain as Kirby Kyle
 Kenneth Mars as  Rabbi Baumel
 Helen Miller as Mrs. Needleman
 Josh Mostel as Uncle Abe
 Don Pardo as "Guess That Tune" Host
 Tony Roberts as "Silver Dollar" Emcee
 Martin Rosenblatt as Mr. Needleman
 Rebecca Schaeffer as Communists' Daughter
 Roger Schwinghammer as Richard
 Wallace Shawn as Masked Avenger
 Martin Sherman as Radio Actor
 Mike Starr as Burglar
 Michael Tucker as Father
 David Warrilow as Roger Daley
 William H. Macy as Radio Voice
 Kenneth Welsh as Radio Voice
 Dianne Wiest as Aunt Bea

Music
The film's soundtrack, which features songs from the 1930s and 40s, plays an integral part in the plot. It was released in 1987 by RCA Victor on LP record through their Novus soundtrack imprint, and also on cassette and compact disc.

Track listing

Release
The film was screened out of competition at the 1987 Cannes Film Festival.

Home media
Radio Days was released on DVD by MGM November 6, 2001.  A limited edition Blu-ray of 3,000 units was later released by Twilight Time
July 8, 2014.

Reception

Critical response
Radio Days holds a 91% rating on Rotten Tomatoes, with an average score of 7.9/10 from 32 reviews.  In his four-star review, noted critic Roger Ebert of the Chicago Sun-Times described Radio Days as Allen’s answer to Federico Fellini’s Amarcord and referred to it as "so ambitious and so audacious that it almost defies description. It's a kaleidoscope of dozens of characters, settings and scenes - the most elaborate production Allen has ever made - and it's inexhaustible, spinning out one delight after another."  Vincent Canby of The New York Times referred to Allen as the "prodigal cinema resource" and spoke of the film saying, "Radio Days [...] is as free in form as it is generous of spirit."

David Denby wrote for New York that: "[...] The real glue, however, is the lullingly beautiful popular music of the period — Cole Porter, Dubin and Warren, big-band jazz, crooners, torch singers, Carmen Miranda. The music, perfectly matched to images of old wood and brick buildings and old glamour spots, produces a mood of distanced, bittersweet nostalgia. Radio Days becomes a gently satiric commemorations of forgotten lives."

In a poll held by Empire magazine of the 500 greatest films ever made, Radio Days was voted number 304.

According to his brother-in-law Jan Harlan, Stanley Kubrick loved Radio Days so much that he watched it "twice within two days, because 'it was like watching a home movie,' he told me... He absolutely adored it."

Awards and nominations

References

Further reading
 Woody Allen On Location by Thierry de Navacelle (Morrow, 1987); a day-to-day account of the making of Radio Days

External links
 
 
 
 
 Review of Radio Days at TVGuide.com
 

1987 films
1987 comedy-drama films
American comedy-drama films
Films about families
Films about radio
Films about radio people
American films based on actual events
Films directed by Woody Allen
Films produced by Robert Greenhut
Films set in 1938
Films set in 1939
Films set in 1940
Films set in 1941
Films set in 1942
Films set in 1943
Films set in 1944
Films set in Brooklyn
Films set in New York City
Films set on the home front during World War II
Films shot in New York City
Films set around New Year
American independent films
1987 independent films
Jewish comedy and humor
Orion Pictures films
Rockaway, Queens
Films with screenplays by Woody Allen
1980s English-language films
1980s American films